Built in 1895–96, the Douglas and McDonald Railroad operated a  line from Douglas to McDonald, Georgia, USA, where it connected with the Brunswick and Western Railroad.  The line was abandoned in 1904.

Defunct Georgia (U.S. state) railroads
Railway companies established in 1895
Railway companies disestablished in 1904
1895 establishments in Georgia (U.S. state)